Tomasz Kołodziejczak (born 13 October 1967) is a Polish science fiction and fantasy writer, screenwriter, publisher and editor of books, comics and role-playing games.

He made his debut in 1985 with the short story Kukiełki (Rag Dolls) in Przegląd Techniczny. He has published several novels: Wybierz swoją śmierć (Choose Your Own Death), Krew i Kamień (Blood and the Stone), Kolory sztandarów (Colors of the Flags), and Schwytany w światła (Caught in the Lights), as well as the short-story collections Wrócę do ciebie, kacie (I’ll Come Back to You, Hangman), Przygody rycerza Darlana (The Adventures of Darlan the Knight); and a game, Rzeźbiarze Pierścieni (Sculptors of the Rings). He has been nominated eight times for the Janusz A. Zajdel Award (last time in 2014), and received it in 1996 for the novel Kolory sztandarów (Colors of banners). In 2008 he published a graphic novel for children, Darlan i Horwazy – Złoty Kur (Darlan and Horwazy: The Golden Hen), with art by Krzysztof Kopeć. He wrote comic scenarios for Uncle Srooge short story "Something for nothing" (Disney) and Batman short story "The procteor of the city" (DC) and also short stories for known Polish comic artist. He is a three-time winner of the Śląkfa Award (for both publishing and fan activity) and winner of the Papcio Chmiel Award for his services to Polish comics. His novels and short stories have been translated into Czech, English, Lithuanian, Hungarian and Russian. He is the author of reviews, essays and literary features, editor of two magazines, Voyager and Magia i Miecz, compiler of anthologies, and presenter of programs about popular culture on television and radio. He is a member of the literary group Klub Tfurcuf. Currently, he is a publisher of comics and board games at the publishing house Egmont Poland.

Works
 1990 Wybierz swoją śmierć - science fiction novel
 1994 Krew i kamień - fantasy novel
 1995 Wrócę do ciebie kacie - science fiction short stories collection
 1996 Kolory Sztandarów - science fiction novel
 1996 Rzeźbiarze Pierścieni - gamebook
 1997 Przygody rycerza Darlana- fantasy children novel
 1999 Schwytany w światła - science fiction novel
 2009 Złoty kur - fantasy children comic
 2010 Czarny Horyzont - fantasy novel
 2011 Głowobójcy - science fiction short stories collection
 2012 Czerwona Mgła - fantasy short stories collection
 2014 Biała Reduta, vol. 1 - fantasy novel
 2015 Wstań i idź - science fiction short stories collection
 2018 Białe źrenice - poetry
 2021 Skaza na niebie - science fiction short stories collection

Translations into English
 2010 "Key of Passage," in A Polish Book of Monsters, edited and translated by Michael Kandel. New York: PIASA Books.

Awards
 2013: Gold Cross of Merit
 2010: Badge of Merit to Culture
 1996: Janusz A. Zajdel Award 
 1991, 1995, 2002: Śląkfa Award

References

  Tomasz Kołodziejczak, biography at komiks.gildia.pl

External links
  "Jestem czytaczem fabuł" - wywiad z Tomaszem Kołodziejczakiem, interview with Tomasz Kołodziejczak at komiks.nast.pl

1967 births
Living people
Polish science fiction writers
Recipients of the Gold Cross of Merit (Poland)
Polish fantasy writers
Polish comics artists